Dale Seidenschwarz, aka Clyde Clifford, is the host of Beaker Street, a weekly freeform rock  radio program.

Beaker Street, which first aired on clear channel KAAY AM 1090 in Little Rock, AR, from 1966 through 1972, was the first underground music program broadcast regularly on a commercial AM radio station.  The show attracted fans from across the western hemisphere with its pioneering format, which featured long album cuts from artists who otherwise would not get airplay. Clyde was one of the pioneers of the album-oriented rock format which became popular on FM radio in the 1970s.

The stage name Clyde Clifford came from an inside joke at KAAY.  The on-air personalities took their stage names from the board of directors of LIN broadcasting, the owners of KAAY.  Clyde W. Clifford was the comptroller general of LIN.

Awards and recognition
Dale Seidenschwarz (aka Clyde Clifford) was inducted into the Missouri Music Hall of Fame in 2014.

References

External links
 The Official Beaker Street Web Site
 KAAY: The Mighty 1090 Gave Arkansas to North America
 Magic 105 FM
 Excerpt of PhD dissertation on Beaker Street
 KAAY Encyclopedia of Arkansas History & Culture
 Missouri Music Hall of Fame Press Release
 Missouri Music Hall of Fame welcomes nine
 Arkansas Rocks 

Year of birth missing (living people)
Living people
American radio DJs